This page provides supplementary chemical data on caffeine.

References 

Chemical data pages
Caffeine
Chemical data pages cleanup